Ralph George Caso (November 26, 1917 – August 31, 1998) was an American politician from New York.

Life
Caso graduated from New York University School of Law and served in World War II. After the war, he practiced law in Merrick, New York. He was a supervisor of the town of Hempstead from 1961 to 1965, and presiding supervisor from 1965 to 1970. Caso also served as county executive in Nassau County from 1970 to 1978.

In 1974, Caso ran for Lieutenant Governor of New York as the running mate of Malcolm Wilson, but the Wilson-Caso ticket was defeated by Democratic Congressman Hugh Carey of Brooklyn and his running mate, State Senator Mary Anne Krupsak of Amsterdam.

Caso died, age 80, of pneumonia at the South Nassau Communities Hospital in Oceanside, Nassau County, New York.

Sources
Ralph G. Caso, 80, Is Dead; Led Nassau County in 1970's in NYT on September 2, 1998

Nassau County Executives
New York University School of Law alumni
1917 births
1998 deaths
People from Hempstead (town), New York
People from Merrick, New York
20th-century American politicians
American military personnel of World War II
Deaths from pneumonia in New York (state)